Sunnybrook State Park is a public recreation area encompassing  in the town of Torrington, Connecticut. The state park is the southwestern terminus for the blue-blazed John Muir Trail which crosses Paugnut State Forest for two miles to the loop trail at Burr Pond State Park. Another park trail bears the name of former property owner Edwin Fadoir. In addition to hiking, the park offers picnicking, hunting, and fishing along the East Branch Naugatuck River. The park opened in 1970 and entered the state rolls in the 1971 edition of the  Connecticut Register and Manual.

References

External links
Sunnybrook State Park Connecticut Department of Energy and Environmental Protection

State parks of Connecticut
Parks in Litchfield County, Connecticut
Torrington, Connecticut
Ponds of Connecticut
Bodies of water of Litchfield County, Connecticut
Protected areas established in 1970